In optics, Matthiessen's ratio is the ratio between the distance from the centre of the lens to the retina, versus the lens radius.

This is of particular importance in fish, where the value may decrease from as high as 3.6 to 2.3, decreasing the focal ratio of the lens. A higher focal ratio is thought to compensate for the relatively high Matthiessen's ratio brought about by constraints of small eye size during early development. This provides a means for larval fish to focus images from different distances, before the ability to accommodate is gained.

See also

References 

Fish anatomy
Eye